Maurice Goldenhar (January 15, 1924 – September 11, 2001) was a Belgian–American ophthalmologist and general practitioner. He emigrated from Belgium to the United States in 1940. He later returned to Europe for medical studies, and then returned once again to the United States.

He first diagnosed what became known as Goldenhar syndrome in 1952.

References

1924 births
2001 deaths
Belgian emigrants to the United States
Belgian ophthalmologists